The Fajã do Ouvidor is a permanent lava field originated (we think) from Pico da Esperança when was active, and the most recent from the collapsing cliffs on the northern coast of the civil parish of Norte Grande, in the municipality of Velas, island of São Jorge, in the Portuguese archipelago of the Azores.

History

The fajã received its name due to its association with Valério Lopes de Azevedo, the magistrate/superintendent of the Donatary-Captain at the time, who was one of the principal property-owners.

During the 17th century, a whale-watching hut was established on the flanks of the fajã in order to spot whales transiting the northern coast. Fisherman from Ouvidor and surrounding settlements would then leave their homes in order to hunt whales: due to the decline of whaling the outpost was abandoned.

There is one religious meeting-point in the fajã: the Hermitage of Nossa Senhora das Dores, which dates to 1903, and includes old images created in the parish of Norte Grande.

In 1948 a formal roadway was opened to the public, from the principal viewpoint to the coast.

Geography

Physical geography
The fajã is known for the geological feature along the coast, including the many poças, or tidal pools (such as the Poça João Dias and Poço do Carneiro). The lava fields generated many natural pools that support protected natural swimming areas, the largest being the Poça de Simão Dias.
Among the waterways that descend from the flanks of Norte Pequeno are the Ribeira da Casa Velha (supporting eels). the Grotinha do Furão and the Ribeira do Ilhéu, supported by two important springs: the Abelheira, situated alongside the roadway to Ouvidor, and the Caminho Velho on the otherside of the main square.

Biome
The more abundant species of fish in the waters include: Mediterranean parrotfish (Sparisoma cretense), moray eel, anchovy, grouper, wrasse, in addition to crabs and limpets.
Marine and terrestrial birds vary throughout the year, influenced by migratory patterns and climate. In addition to local terns, shearwaters and herons, the fajã is visited by wagtails, sparrows and common blackbird (Turdus merula) throughout the year, with other species arriving in the summer months.

Human geography
The fajã is occupied by couple of dozen homes, some dating back centuries. But, less than half those homes are constantly inhabited throughout the year. The majority of the remaining homes, and new dwellings are inhabited during the summer months, when local population "booms" with summer tourists and visitors: there are approximately 30 families that have homes in this community. It is one of the few fajãs that have a sufficient population to support a disco, café, restaurant and lighthouse and is one of the most visited fajãs on the island, due to its ease and access from the interior.

During the winter months there are farmers who graze their few cattle on private land, but generally, arable land is occupied by potato, bean, corn, garlic, onions and small vineyards. The fishing port that includes a crane, supports various maritime activities including boating and recreational and artisanal fishing, using hooks or nets.

Culture
The festival honour Our Lady of Sorrows occurs annually on the third Sunday in September, with mass, sermon and a procession paying vows of its parishioners.

See also
 List of fajãs in the Azores

References

External links
 Photos of Fajã do Ouvidor
 TrailAzores

São Jorge Island
Velas
Ouvidor